George Muir may refer to:

 George Muir (politician) (1903–1970), member of the Canadian House of Commons from 1957 to 1970
 George Muir (Australian footballer) (1896–1959), played Australian football in the 1910s with the Fitzroy and Carlton clubs
 George Harvey Muir (1869–1939), English footballer for Southampton F.C., later becoming a director
 George Muir (field hockey) (born 1994), New Zealand field hockey player
 George Muir (footballer, born 1937) (1937–2008), Scottish footballer for Hibernians and Yeovil Town
 George Muir (footballer, born 1940) (1940–1999), Scottish footballer for Partick Thistle and Dumbarton